Adam Miles (born 19 September 1989) is an English cricketer. He has played first-class cricket for Otago and Cardiff MCC University.

See also
 List of Otago representative cricketers

References

External links
 

1989 births
Living people
English cricketers
Otago cricketers
Cardiff MCCU cricketers
Sportspeople from Swindon
Wiltshire cricketers